Hoda is a surname (alternate spellings include Houda and Huda). Notable people with that name include:

Jamileh Alam al-Hoda, wife of President of Iran, Ebrahim Raisi
Mansur Hoda (1930–2001), Indian Technologist
Noor-ol-Hoda Mangeneh, Iranian writer 
 Sayyid Ahmad al-Hoda, Iranian cleric
 Seyed Abdol Javad al-Hoda, Iranian cleric
 Surur Hoda (1928–2003) Indian politician
 Syed A. Hoda, American-Pakistani academic

See also

Houda (surname)
Huda (surname)